is a former Japanese football player.

Playing career
Matsushita was born in Kagoshima on 17 October 1983. After graduating from high school, he joined J1 League club Gamba Osaka in 2002. He debuted in first season and played several matches as right side midfielder every season. In 2005, he played many matches as substitute. However he could hardly play in the match behind new player Akira Kaji in 2006. In June 2006, he moved to Albirex Niigata. He played many matches as substitute midfielder until 2007. In 2008, he became a regular player as offensive midfielder. In 2010, he moved to FC Tokyo. However his opportunity to play decreased from summer.

In 2011, he moved to Vegalta Sendai. He played many matches offensive midfielder and defensive midfielder. Vegalta finished at the 4th place in 2011 season which is best results in the club history. In addition, Vegalta won the 2nd place in 2012 season. In 2014, he moved to J2 League club Yokohama FC. He played many matches as right midfielder. However his opportunity to play decreased in 2016. In 2017, he moved to his local club Kagoshima United FC in J3 League. He played in 2 seasons and retired end of 2018 season.

Club statistics
Updated to 1 January 2019.

References

External links

1983 births
Living people
Association football people from Kagoshima Prefecture
Japanese footballers
J1 League players
J2 League players
J3 League players
Gamba Osaka players
Albirex Niigata players
FC Tokyo players
Vegalta Sendai players
Yokohama FC players
Kagoshima United FC players
Association football midfielders
People from Kagoshima